Valentin "Vali" Preda (born May 24, 1985, in Brăila) is a Romanian swimmer, who specialized in breaststroke events. He represented his nation Romania at the 2008 Summer Olympics, and has also claimed multiple Romanian national records in the breaststroke (both 100 and 200 m), and medley relays (both 200 and 400 m). Preda is a former member of the swimming team for the Louisville Cardinals, and a graduate of exercise science at the University of Louisville in Louisville, Kentucky.

Preda competed for Romania in two swimming events at the 2008 Summer Olympics in Beijing. Leading up to the Games, he scored an eighteenth-place time in 1:02.16 (100 m breaststroke) to beat the FINA B-cut (1:03.72) at the European Championships five months earlier in Eindhoven, Netherlands. In the 100 m breaststroke, Preda fired off a 1:01.77 to drop his own Romanian record on a tech body suit by 0.11 of a second and tie for third with Sweden's Jonas Andersson in heat five, but failed to advance to the semifinals, finishing thirty-first overall in the prelims. Nearly a week later, Preda teamed up with Răzvan Florea, Ioan Gherghel, and Norbert Trandafir in the 4 × 100 m medley relay. Swimming the breaststroke leg in heat one, Preda recorded a split of 1:01.41, before the Romanian foursome finished the race in fifth position and thirteenth overall with a new national record of 3:38.00.

References

External links
Player Bio – Louisville Cardinals
NBC 2008 Olympics profile

1985 births
Living people
Romanian male breaststroke swimmers
Olympic swimmers of Romania
Swimmers at the 2008 Summer Olympics
Sportspeople from Brăila
Louisville Cardinals men's swimmers